The Gruža is a village located in the municipality of Knić, central Serbia. The village is located near the Gruža Lake dam, few kilometers to the north from the river. It is a typical example of the stretched road village along the Kragujevac–Kraljevo road and railway. It is a small, depopulating settlement with a population of 153 inhabitants (as of 2011 census).

Notable people
 Miroslav Ilić (b. 1950), folk singer

References

 Popis stanovništva, domaćinstava i Stanova 2002. Knjiga 1: Nacionalna ili etnička pripadnost po naseljima. Republika Srbija, Republički zavod za statistiku Beograd 2003. 

Populated places in Šumadija District
Šumadija